The Ward Brothers' House and Shop is a historic home located at Crisfield, Somerset County, Maryland, United States. It consists of a two-story, two-bay, one-room plan frame dwelling built around 1880, and the brothers' barber shop, a composite building composed of individual structures grouped together behind a long false front.  The brothers Lemuel T. Ward, Jr. (1896–1985) and Steve Ward (1895–1976) are recognized as the fathers of the modern movement in decorative wildlife, or decoy, carving in America.

The Ward Brothers' House and Shop was listed on the National Register of Historic Places in 1997. The house was demolished in November 2013.

References

External links
 , including photo from 1992, at Maryland Historical Trust

Houses in Somerset County, Maryland
Crisfield, Maryland
Houses on the National Register of Historic Places in Maryland
Houses completed in 1880
National Register of Historic Places in Somerset County, Maryland
Barber shops